Roland Brehmer (born 23 June 1943) is a Polish long-distance runner. He competed in the men's 5000 metres at the 1968 Summer Olympics.

References

1943 births
Living people
Athletes (track and field) at the 1968 Summer Olympics
Polish male long-distance runners
Olympic athletes of Poland
Sportspeople from Katowice